The 1914 Iowa gubernatorial election was held on November 3, 1914. Incumbent Republican George W. Clarke defeated Democratic nominee John Taylor Hamilton with 49.31% of the vote.

General election

Candidates
Major party candidates
George W. Clarke, Republican
John Taylor Hamilton, Democratic 

Other candidates
George C. White, Progressive
Oliver C. Wilson, Socialist
Malcolm Smith, Prohibition

Results

References

1914
Iowa
Gubernatorial